Buffalo Mills is an unincorporated community in Bedford County, Pennsylvania, United States. Buffalo Mills has a post office, with ZIP code 15534.

References

Unincorporated communities in Bedford County, Pennsylvania
Unincorporated communities in Pennsylvania